The medieval story of al-Nadirah is about the fall of Hatra and its princess, who fell in love with the young king Shapur I while he was besieging the city.

This partially fictional narrative is recorded in Persian and Arabic sources of the early Islamic period, and some of its elements inspired some modern stories. Its general theme has common features with some Greek and Roman legends.

Plot

According to early Islamic traditions, al-Nadirah ( an-Naḍīrah;  Nazirah) was the daughter of al-Dayzan or Satirun (Sanatruq II), the king of Araba. She betrayed the fortified capital, Hatra, to the Persian king Shapur I after seeing and falling in love with him while he was besieging the city. She did this by intoxicating her father and the guards of the city gates, or by revealing to the enemy the talisman on which the city's ownership depended. Shapur I captured and destroyed Hatra and killed its king. He departed with al-Nadirah and married her at Ayn al-Tamr. One night al-Nadirah could not sleep, complaining that her bed is too rough for her. It then turned out that a myrtle leaf was stuck in her skin and was irritating her. Astonished by her softness, Shapur I asked her how did her father bring her up, and she described how well he treated her. Shapur I realizes al-Nadirah's ingratitude towards her father and has her executed in a brutal manner.

Sources

The story is mentioned in Arabic and Persian literature and the poetry of the early Islamic period, including al-Tabari's Tarikh al-Tabari, Mirkhond's Rawzat as-Safa', Ibn Khallikan's Wafayāt al-Aʿyān, and Ferdowsi's Shahnama, where she is recorded as Mālikah, daughter of king Tā'ir, while the Persian king is Shapur II, instead of Shapur I.

Analysis

According to Theodor Nöldeke, al-Tabari's story is derived from the Greek tale of Scylla and her father Nisos. Some consider it as a Middle Eastern version of the Tarpeia theme. The theme of Al-Nadirah's legend was used in Hans Christian Andersen's fairy tale "The Princess and the Pea" and Ahmed Shawqi's Waraqat al-As (The Myrtle Leaf).

References

Hatra
Medieval Arabic literature
Shapur I
Medieval Arabic poems
Love in Arabic literature
Legendary Arab people
Medieval legends
Fictional princesses
Middle East in fiction
Fictional Iraqi people
Islamic fiction
Medieval Persian literature
Love stories
Romance characters
Women from the Sasanian Empire
Women in pre-Islamic Arabia